Caprari is an Italian surname. Notable people with the surname include:

Gastón Caprari (born 1985), Argentine footballer
Gianluca Caprari (born 1993), Italian footballer
Sergio Caprari (1932–2015), Italian boxer
Toni Caprari, actor (List of Black Sails characters)
Tony Caprari, South African actor and director

Italian-language surnames